Nexus is the fifth album by British rock band Argent. Released in March 1974 on CBS Records (USA: Epic Records KE 32573).

Track listing 
Songs written by Rod Argent and Chris White except as noted.

Personnel 
Argent
 Rod Argent – organ, electric piano, lead vocals on "Music from the Spheres"
 Russ Ballard – guitar, vocals
 Jim Rodford – bass guitar, guitar, vocals
 Robert Henrit – drums, percussion

Chart

References 

1974 albums
Argent (band) albums
Epic Records albums
Albums produced by Rod Argent
Albums produced by Chris White (musician)